Olary Creek is an ephemeral watercourse in the Mid North region of South Australia. Blackfellows Creek, Wiawera Creek and Gall Well Creek flow into Olary Creek. The Barrier Highway and the Crystal Brook to Broken Hill railway line also cross the creek. The creek flows generally eastwards before heading south towards the Murray Darling Basin where it spreads out and is absorbed into the surrounding floodplain. It runs through the small rural locality of Olary.

References 

Rivers of South Australia